The 1958–59 season was FC Steaua București's 11th season since its founding in 1947.

Divizia A

League table

Results 

Source:

Cupa României

Results

See also

 1958–59 Cupa României
 1958–59 Divizia A

Notes and references

External links
 1958–59 FC Steaua București Divizia A matches

FC Steaua București seasons
1958–59 in Romanian football
Steaua, București
Steaua